Ștefan Petcu (born 17 March 1957) is a Romanian retired footballer, who most notably played for Farul Constanţa and Steaua București. On 25 March 2008 he was decorated by the president of Romania, Traian Băsescu with Ordinul "Meritul Sportiv" — (The Order "The Sportive Merit") class II for his part in winning the 1986 European Cup Final.

Honours
Steaua București
Divizia A: 1984–85, 1985–86
Cupa României: 1984–85
FC Constanța
Divizia B: 1980–81, 1987–88

References

1957 births
Living people
Romanian footballers
Liga I players
Liga II players
FC Steaua București players
FC Bihor Oradea players
FCV Farul Constanța players
CS Portul Constanța players
AFC Unirea Slobozia players
Place of birth missing (living people)
Association football forwards
Romanian football managers
FCV Farul Constanța managers